US Post Office-Carthage is a historic post office building located at Carthage in Jefferson County, New York. It was designed and built in 1934–1935, and is one of a number of post offices in New York State designed by the Office of the Supervising Architect of the Treasury Department, Louis A. Simon.  The one story brick building is in the Colonial Revival style. It features a central pavilion with the entrance and flanking tripartite windows, set beneath a portico supported by four Doric columns.

It was listed on the National Register of Historic Places in 1988.

References

Carthage
Government buildings completed in 1935
Colonial Revival architecture in New York (state)
Buildings and structures in Jefferson County, New York
National Register of Historic Places in Jefferson County, New York